Agnès Desarthe ( Naouri; born 3 May 1966) is a French novelist, children's writer and translator.

Biography
Desarthe was born 3 May 1966 in Paris. She is the daughter of the pediatrician and writer Aldo Naouri. She is married to filmmaker , son of actor . They have four children. Her brother is the opera singer Laurent Naouri. She studied English literature.

She started her career as a translator. In 1992, she published her first novel. She became a prolific writer of children's books. In 1996 she was awarded the Prix du Livre Inter for her second novel Un secret sans importance. Her most successful novel, Chez Moi, has been translated into over 15 languages. One of her more recent novels, Dans la nuit brune, received the Prix Renaudot des lycéens in 2010. Her novels are published in France by Éditions de l'Olivier and in the UK by Portobello Books.

Awards and honours 
 1996: Prix du Livre Inter for Un secret sans importance
 2007: Prix Maurice-Edgar Coindreau for Les papiers de Puttermesser (translation of The Puttermesser Papers by Cynthia Ozick)
 2007: Prix Laure Bataillon for Les papiers de Puttermesser (translation of The Puttermesser Papers by Cynthia Ozick)
 2009: Prix Marcel Pagnol for Le Remplaçant
 2009: Prix du roman Version Femina - Virgin Megastore for Le Remplaçant
 2010: Prix Renaudot des lycéens for Dans la nuit brune
 2012: Prix littéraire 30 millions d'amis ( Goncourt des animaux) for Une partie de chasse
 2014: Prix Anna-de-Noailles of the Académie Française for Comment j'ai appris à lire
 2015: Prix littéraire du Monde for Ce cœur changeant
 2015:  Chevalier of the Legion of Honour

Nominations
 2002: Independent Foreign Fiction Prize shortlist for Five Photos of My Wife
 2002: Jewish Quarterly-Wingate Prize shortlist for Five Photos of My Wife
 2003: International Dublin Literary Award longlist for Five Photos of My Wife
 2021: Prix Goncourt second selection for L'éternel fiancé

Bibliography

Novels
 Quelques minutes de bonheur absolu. Éditions de l'Olivier. 1993
 Un secret sans importance. Éditions de l'Olivier. 1996
 Cinq photos de ma femme. Éditions de l'Olivier. 1998
 
 Les bonnes intentions. Éditions de l'Olivier. 2000
 
 Le principe de Frédelle. Éditions de l'Olivier. 2003
 Mangez-moi. Éditions de l'Olivier. 2006
 
 Le Remplaçant. Éditions de l'Olivier. 2009
 Dans la nuit brune. Éditions de l'Olivier. 2010
 
 Une partie de chasse. Éditions de l'Olivier. 2012
 
 Ce cœur changeant. Éditions de l'Olivier. 2015
 La Chance de leur vie. Éditions de l'Olivier. 2018
 L'éternel fiancé. Éditions de l'Olivier. 2021

Children's novels
 Je ne t'aime pas, Paulus. L'École des loisirs. 1992
 Abo, le minable homme des neiges.illustrations by Claude Boujon. L'École des loisirs. 1992
 Les Peurs de Conception. L'École des loisirs. 1992
 La Fête des pères. L'École des loisirs. 1992
 Le Mariage de Simon. illustrations by Anaïs Vaugelade. L'École des loisirs. 1992
 Le Roi Ferdinand. L'École des loisirs. 1992
 Dur de dur. L'École des loisirs. 1993
 La Femme du bouc émissaire. illustrations by Willi Glasauer. L'École des loisirs. 1993
 Benjamin, héros solitaire. L'École des loisirs. 1994
 Tout ce qu'on ne dit pas. L'École des loisirs. 1995
 Poète maudit. L'École des loisirs. 1995
 L'Expédition. illustrations by Willi Glasauer. L'École des loisirs. 1995
 Je manque d'assurance. L'École des loisirs. 1997
 Les pieds de Philomène. illustrations by Anaïs Vaugelade. L'École des loisirs. 1997
 Les grandes questions. L'École des loisirs. 1999
 Les trois vœux de l'archiduchesse. illustrations by Anaïs Vaugelade. L'École des loisirs. 2000
 Petit prince Pouf. illustrations by Claude Ponti. L'École des loisirs. 2002
 Le monde d'à-côté. L'École des loisirs. 2002
 À deux c'est mieux. L'École des loisirs. 2004
 Comment j'ai changé ma vie. L'École des loisirs. 2004
 Igor le labrador. illustrations by Anaïs Vaugelade. L'École des loisirs. 2004
 C'est qui le plus beau ?. illustrations by Anaïs Vaugelade. L'École des loisirs. 2005
 Je ne t'aime toujours pas, Paulus. L'École des loisirs. 2005
 Les frères chats. illustrations by Anaïs Vaugelade. L'École des loisirs. 2005
 La Cinquième saison. L'École des loisirs. 2006
 Je veux être un cheval. illustrations by Anaïs Vaugelade. L'École des loisirs. 2006
 L'histoire des Carnets de Lineke. L'École de Loisirs. 2007
 La plus belle fille du monde. L'École de Loisirs. 2009
 Mission impossible. illustrations by Anaïs Vaugelade. L'École des loisirs. 2009
 Dingo et le sens de la vie. illustrations by Anaïs Vaugelade. L'École des loisirs. 2012
 Le Poulet fermier. illustrations by Anaïs Vaugelade. L'École des loisirs. 2013
 Mes animaux (anthology). illustrations by Anaïs Vaugelade. L'École des loisirs. 2014

Short fiction

Plays
 Les Chevaliers
 Le Kit

Nonfiction 
 V.W. Le mélange des genres. co-written with Geneviève Brisac. Éditions de l'Olivier. 2004; book about Virginia Woolf
 Lois Lowry. L'École des loisirs. 2011; children's book about Lois Lowry
 Comment j'ai appris à lire. Éditions Stock. 2013
 Le roi René. Éditions Odile Jacob. 2016; biography of René Urtreger
 Maurice Sendak. co-written with Béatrice Michielsen and Bernard Noël. L'École des loisirs. 2016; children's book about Maurice Sendak

Prefaces
 Virginia Woolf. Journal intégral, 1915-1941. collection La Cosmopolite. Éditions Stock. 2008; translated by Marie-Ange Dutartre and Colette-Marie Huet

Translations
 Aimee Bender: L'ombre de moi-même. Éditions de l'Olivier. 2001
 Aimee Bender: Des créatures obstinées. Éditions de l'Olivier. 2007
 Alice Thomas Ellis: Les habits neufs de Margaret. Éditions de l'Olivier. 1993
 Alice Thomas Ellis: Les ivresses de Madame Monro. Éditions de l'Olivier. 1993
 Alice Thomas Ellis: Les égarements de Lili. Éditions de l'Olivier. 1994
 Alice Thomas Ellis: Les oiseaux du ciel. Éditions de l'Olivier. 1995
 Anne Fine: Le jeu des sept familles. L'École des loisirs. 1995
 Anne Fine: Comment écrire comme un cochon. L'École des loisirs. 1997
 Anne Fine: Billy le transi. L'École des loisirs. 2006
 Jean Fritz: La longue marche: Les 9000 kilomètres qui ont amené Mao au pouvoir. L'École des loisirs. 1990
 Mary Downing Hahn: La saison des méduses. L'École des loisirs. 1996
 Polly Horvath: Une fille intrépide. L'École des loisirs. 2010
 M.E. Kerr: Est-ce bien vous, Miss Blue ?. L'École des loisirs. 1990
 Tony Kushner: Brundibar. illustrations by Maurice Sendak. L'École des loisirs. 2005
 Elena Lappin: La marche nuptiale. Éditions de l'Olivier. 2000
 Elena Lappin: Le nez. Éditions de l'Olivier. 2002
 Gail Carson Levine: Belle comme le jour. L'École des loisirs. 2008
 Leo Lionni: Monsieur MacSouris. L'École des loisirs. 1993
 Lois Lowry: Anastasia, demande à ton psy !. L'École des loisirs. 1990
 Lois Lowry: Compte les étoiles. L'École des loisirs. 1990
 Lois Lowry: Anastasia, à votre service. L'École des loisirs. 1991
 Lois Lowry: La centième chose que j'aime chez toi, Caroline. L'École des loisirs. 1991
 Lois Lowry: Le passeur. L'École des loisirs. 1994
 Lois Lowry: Anastasia Krupnick. L'École des loisirs. 1996
 Lois Lowry: C'est encore Anastasia. L'École des loisirs. 1997
 Lois Lowry: Anastasia connaît la réponse. L'École des loisirs. 1999
 Lois Lowry: Toute la vérité sur Sam. L'École des loisirs. 1999
 Lois Lowry: Anastasia avec conviction. L'École des loisirs. 2002
 Lois Lowry: Le nom de code d'Anastasia. L'École des loisirs. 2004
 Lois Lowry: Messager. L'École des loisirs. 2004
 Lois Lowry: Une carrière de rêve pour Anastasia . L'École des loisirs. 2005
 Lois Lowry: Le bal d'anniversaire. L'École des loisirs. 2011
 Betty MacDonald: Madame Bigote-Gigote. L'École des loisirs. 1991
 Betty MacDonald: Madame Bigote-Gigote a plus d'un tour dans son sac. L'École des loisirs. 1991
 Patricia MacLachlan: Nous sommes tous sa famille. L'École des loisirs. 1994
 James Marshall: Pieds de cochons. illustrations by Maurice Sendak. L'École des loisirs. 2001
 Jay McInerney: La belle vie. Éditions de l'Olivier. 2007
 Jay McInerney: Moi tout craché. Éditions de l'Olivier. 2009
 Alice Munro: Un peu, beaucoup, passionnément, à la folie, pas du tout. Éditions Points. 2019
 Anaïs Nin: L'intemporalité perdue et autres nouvelles. NiL. 2020
 Cynthia Ozick: Les papiers de Puttermesser. Éditions de l'Olivier. 2007
 Cynthia Ozick: Corps étrangers. Éditions de l'Olivier. 2012
 Louise Plummer: Je m'appelle Susan. L'École des loisirs. 1993
 Chaim Potok: L'arbre du ciel. L'École des loisirs. 2000
 Chaim Potok: Le Roi du ciel. L'École des loisirs. 2001
 Peggy Rathmann: À quatre pattes les bébés sont partis. L'École des loisirs. 2005
 Peggy Rathmann: L'agent Boucle et Gloria. L'École des loisirs. 2005
 Emma Richler: Sœur folie. Éditions de l'Olivier. 2004
 Louis Sachar: Pas à pas. L'École des loisirs. 2006
 Allen Say: Allison. L'École des loisirs. 1998
 Allen Say: Le bonhomme Kamashibai. L'École des loisirs. 2006
 Ann Herbert Scott: Sur les genoux de maman. L'École des loisirs. 1993
 Maurice Sendak: Mini-bibliothèque. L'École des loisirs. 2010
 Peter Spier: Cirque Mariano. L'École des loisirs. 1992.
 Chris Van Allsburg: Le balai magique. L'École des loisirs. 1993
 Ellen Weiss: Le Pôle-Express : Un voyage au pays du Père Noël. L'École des loisirs. 2004
 Virginia Woolf: La maison de Carlyle et autres esquisses. Mercure de France. 2004

 References 

 External links 
 Agnès Desarthe :: Écrivain Desarthe's own website with bio and bibliography
 Agnès Desarthe Portobello Books Her UK publisher's authors page
 A Page in the Life: Agnès Desarthe Interview by Tim Martin in The Telegraph about her new novel The Foundling The Foundling by Agnès Desarthe, translated by Adriana Hunter A review by Alfred Hickling in The Guardian Unnamed Press | Hunting Party Hunting Party'' US publisher's page

1966 births
Living people
20th-century French non-fiction writers
21st-century French non-fiction writers
French women novelists
French feminist writers
French children's writers
French women children's writers
Writers from Paris
20th-century French women writers
21st-century French women writers
Prix du Livre Inter winners
English–French translators
Chevaliers of the Légion d'honneur
Prix Renaudot des lycéens winners